Daniel Francis may refer to:

 Daniel Francis (historian) (born 1947), Canadian historian and journalist
 Daniel Francis (American football) (born 1984), American and Canadian football defensive back
 Daniel Francis (actor), British actor
 Danny Francis (footballer, born 1986) (born 1986), Dominican football forward
 Daniel Francis (footballer, born 2002), Sierra Leonean football left-back
 Daniel Francis (footballer, born 2003), Nigerian football midfielder